Li Kaixian was a Chinese writer, playwright and literary critic of the Ming Dynasty. He was retired from the government at age 39, and then devoted his life to literature and Chinese opera. He was a member of the circle of intellectuals gathered folk songs and ballads. His first play Sword was a chuanqi play. The play is based on the plot of the novel Water Margin, but the story of Lin Chong had been changed.

Ming dynasty writers
1502 births
1568 deaths
16th-century Chinese dramatists and playwrights